The Mind Cure is a 1912 silent short film starring Pearl White. It was made by Crystal Film Company and is preserved at the Library of Congress. As initially released it was shown in split-reel form with another short Oh That Lemonade.

Cast
Pearl White - Pearl
Chester Barnett - Chester, Her Beau

References

External links
 The Mind Cure @ IMDb.com

1912 films
American silent short films
Silent American comedy films
1912 comedy films
1912 short films
American black-and-white films
American comedy short films
1910s American films